Major Mohit Sharma  (13 January 1978 – 21 March 2009) was an Indian Army Officer who was posthumously awarded the Ashoka Chakra, India's highest peace-time military decoration. Maj Sharma was from the elite 1st Para SF. 

On 21 March 2009, he engaged in an encounter with Pakistan-sponsored terrorists in the Hafruda forest of the Kupwara sector of Jammu and Kashmir. He killed four terrorists and rescued two teammates in the process, but sustained multiple gunshot wounds. For this act, he was posthumously awarded the Ashoka Chakra, which is the highest peace time military decoration in India. He was awarded two gallantry decorations earlier in his career. The first was the COAS Commendation card for exemplary counter-terrorism duties during Operation Rakshak, which was followed by a Sena Medal for gallantry after a covert operation in 2005. 

In 2019, Delhi Metro Corporation renamed the Rajendra Nagar metro station as "Major Mohit Sharma (Rajendra Nagar) metro station".

Early life and education 
Mohit was born on 13 January 1978 in Rohtak, Haryana in a Hindu Brahmin family. He was very naughty since childhood. His nickname in family was "Chintu" while his NDA batch mates call him "Mike". He completed his 12th schooling from DPS Ghaziabad in 1995 after which he appeared for his NDA Exam. At the same time he got admission to Shri Sant Gajanan Maharaj College of Engineering, Shegaon, Maharashtra, during which he cleared the SSB interview and joined the National Defence Academy (NDA).

Military career 
In 1995, Sharma left Engineering and joined NDA to pursue his dream. In his training, he proved his expertise in swimming, boxing and horse riding. His favourite horse was "Indira". Sharma became the champion of horse riding. He was also a winner in Boxing under the featherweight category.

Mohit Sharma joined the Indian Military Academy (IMA) in 1998. In IMA, he was awarded the rank of Battalion Cadet Adjutant. He got a chance to meet the then President of India K. R. Narayanan at the Rashtrapati Bhavan. He was commissioned as a lieutenant in December 1999.

His first posting was Hyderabad in the 5th Battalion The Madras Regiment (5 Madras). On completing three successful years of Military service, Major Mohit opted for the Para (Special Forces) and he became a trained Para Commando in June 2003, followed by promotion to captain on 11 December. Before getting in 1 Para (SF), he served with the 38 Rashtriya Rifles. He was then posted in Kashmir where he showed his leadership and bravery. Promoted as major on 11 December 2005, he was awarded with the Sena Medal for his bravery. During the third posting, he was given the responsibility to train the Commandos in Belgaum where he instructed for two years. Mohit Sharma was then again moved to Kashmir where he attained martyrdom in 2009.

Ashoka Chakra 

For the supreme sacrifice made by Major Mohit Sharma during Kupwara operation, he was awarded with the nation's highest peace time gallantry award 'Ashok Chakra' on January 26, 2010.

See also 
 Sanjog Chhetri
 Major Mohit Sharma Rajendra Nagar metro station

References

External link
 Major Mohit Sharma Biography

2009 deaths
Recipients of the Ashoka Chakra (military decoration)
1978 births
Indian Army officers
Ashoka Chakra
Recipients of the Sena Medal
Para Commandos
Sena Medal
National Defence Academy (India) alumni